Discovery Kids was a British and Irish pay television channel. The channel initially began broadcasting exclusively on the On Digital service time sharing with Discovery Wings, an aviation-focused channel similarly created initially as an On Digital exclusive. The channel eventually became available on other digital platforms such as Sky Digital, and Virgin Media.

Discovery Kids and Discovery Wings were both closed down at midnight on 28 February 2007, to be replaced by Discovery Turbo the following day. Discovery Kids was replaced with an online broadband video service called Discovery Kids On Demand, not updated since the closure of the TV channel. Some of Discovery Kids' previous programmes like The Save-Ums!, Timeblazers and Mystery Hunters were later shown on DMAX during the mornings. It was owned by Discovery UK.

See also 
 Discovery Wings

References

Defunct television channels in the United Kingdom
Television channels and stations established in 2000
Television channels and stations disestablished in 2007
2000 establishments in the United Kingdom
2000 establishments in Ireland
2007 disestablishments in the United Kingdom
2007 disestablishments in Ireland
UK and Ireland
Television channel articles with incorrect naming style
Children's television channels in the United Kingdom